Tasmania, for its size and population, has a flourishing literary culture. Its history offers an eventful literary background with visits from early explorers such as the Dutchman Abel Tasman, the Frenchmen Bruni d'Entrecasteaux and Marion du Fresne and then the Englishmen Matthew Flinders and George Bass. Colonisation coincided with deteriorated relations with indigenous Aboriginal people and a harsh convict heritage. These events in Tasmanian history are found in a large number of colonial sandstone buildings and in place names. Environmentally, the landscapes and changeable weather provide a vivid literary backdrop. Tasmania's geographical isolation, creative community, proximity to Antarctica, controversial past, bourgeoning arts reputation, and island status all contribute to its significant literature. Many fiction and non-fiction authors call Tasmania home, and many acclaimed titles are set there or written by Tasmanians. The journal of letters Island magazine appears quarterly. Tasmania's government provides arts funding in the form of prizes, events and grants. Bookshops contribute book launches and other literary events. Tasmania's unique history and environment gave rise to Tasmanian Gothic literature in the 19th century.

Notable Tasmanian authors and poets
In birth order:
Reverend John West (1809–1873), journalist and historian
Louisa Ann Meredith (1812–1895), author and illustrator
Marcus Clarke (1846–1881), journalist and author
"Tasma" (Jessie Couvreur) (1848–1897), author
Nan Chauncy (1900–1970), author
Clive Sansom (1910–1981), poet and playwright
Christopher Koch (1932–2013), author
Margaret Scott (1934–2005), poet
Amanda Lohrey (born 1947), author
Pete Hay, poet
Stephen Dando-Collins, author
Stephen Edgar (born 1951), poet
Lian Tanner (born 1951), author
Martin Flanagan (born 1955), journalist
Katherine Scholes (born 1959), author
Julie Hunt, children's author
Richard Flanagan (born 1961), author
Liz Winfield (born 1964), poet
Heather Rose (born 1964), author
Rachael Treasure (born 1968), author
Bradley Trevor Greive (born 1970), author
Danielle Wood (born 1972), author

Notable Tasmanian books
In publication order:
Notes and Sketches of New South Wales, 1844, by Louisa Ann Meredith
My Residence in Tasmania, 1852, by Louisa Anne Meredith
History of Tasmania, 1852, by Rev. John West
Bush Friends in Tasmania, 1860 and 1891, by Louisa Anne Meredith
For the Term of His Natural Life, 1870–1872, by Marcus Clarke
Uncle Piper of Piper's Hill, 1889 by "Tasma"
They Found A Cave, 1949, by Nan Chauncy
World's End Was Home, 1952, by Nan Chauncy
Tangara, 1960, by Nan Chauncy
The Doubleman, 1985, by Christopher Koch
View from the Non-Members' Bar, 1992, by Pete HayOut of Ireland, 1999, by Christopher KochGould's Book of Fish, 2001, by Richard FlanaganThe Blue Day Book, 2001, by Bradley Trevor GreiveMain Currents of Environmental Thought, 2002, by Peter HayVandemonian Essays, 2002, by Pete HayThe Alphabet of Light and Dark, 2003, by Danielle WoodThe Butterfly Man, 2005, by Heather RoseSilently on the Tide, 2005, by Pete HayThe Roving Party, 2011, by Rohan WilsonThe Narrow Road to the Deep North, 2013, by Richard FlanaganTo Name Those Lost, 2014, by Rohan WilsonEssays from Near and Far, 2014, by James DryburghThe Mountain, 2014, by Mark ClemensThe Museum of Modern Love, 2016, by Heather RoseThe Field of Dreams, 2016, by Mark ClemensBridget Crack, 2017, by Rachel LearyBruny, 2019, by Heather RoseA Treacherous Country, 2020, by Katherine KruiminkThe Rain Heron, 2020, by Robbie ArnottThe Octopus and I, 2020, by Erin Hortle

Tasmanian Literary Awards
Tasmania Book Prize
Margaret Scott Prize
University of Tasmania Prize
Tasmanian Young Writer's Fellowship

See also
Music in Tasmania
Geography of Tasmania
List of Australian novelists
List of Australian poets

References

Further reading
 
 Robson, L. L. (1983). A History of Tasmania. Volume I. Van Diemen's Land From the Earliest Times to 1855. Melbourne: Oxford University Press. .
 Robson, L. L. (1991). A History of Tasmania. Volume II. Colony and State From 1856 to the 1980s''. Melbourne: Oxford University Press. .

External links
 TasWriters
 Island—a Tasmanian literary magazine

 
Australian literature
Literature